OutRun Online Arcade is a racing video game and the most recent release in the OutRun series. It was developed by Sumo Digital and published by Sega. The game was released on April 15, 2009 on Xbox Live Arcade and released exclusively in Europe for the PlayStation 3 a day later via the PlayStation Network. Gameplay involves players racing their choice of Ferrari through a selection of fifteen stages in the shortest time possible.

The game was fairly well received by critics, with aggregate scores averaging 78% for both platforms at GameRankings. Reviewers generally felt that the game was a faithful adaptation of the OutRun 2 series of games. The upgraded high definition graphics were also lauded. Critics felt that the game was worth the price, but some felt that the amount of available content was lacking considering the cars and stages available in the series' other titles. OutRun Online was taken down from PlayStation Network in October 2010 and it was removed from Xbox Live Arcade in December 2011 due to the expiration of their contract with Ferrari.

Gameplay
In OutRun Online Arcade, the player navigates a car from a rear third-person perspective to race through a selection of fifteen stages. At the end of each stage, the player is presented with a fork in the road that allows the player to choose one of two stages. The left route presents an easier stage, while the right provides a greater challenge. The game times the player's performance, and passing through checkpoints award the player with extra time. Once the timer reaches zero or the player completes the race, the game ends.

OutRun Online Arcade features four modes of play: OutRun, Time Attack, Continuous Race, and Heart Attack. In OutRun mode, the player drives through five of fifteen stages, selecting them en route. The Continuous mode is similar to OutRun mode, but instead the player must drive through all fifteen stages. As in previous games in the series, there is a time limit that is extended upon passing checkpoints. Time Attack mode has the player race a ghost car over a pre-selected set of stages while timed. Time checks are presented to the player at various points on each stage.

Heart Attack mode is an expansion on OutRun mode. In addition to attempting to complete certain stages, a passenger riding in the player's vehicle will frequently request certain stunts and actions. These requests can include passing cars, drifting around bends, driving through marked lanes, knocking over cones, and avoiding crashes into objects for as long as possible. If successful, the player receives hearts from the passenger. Crashing into the scenery results in the player losing hearts. At the end of each section and stage, the player is graded based on the number of hearts received. Should the player reach a goal with a satisfying grade, a romantic ending is displayed.

Players can also compete in multiplayer races with up to six players. The hosting player can adjust options for the race, including the ability to toggle vehicle collisions, give a speed boost to allow slower players to catch up, and set the vehicle performance to normal or tuned. Online leaderboards are also present in the game, divided by game mode, vehicle performance setting, and driving stage.

Development
Partially based on OutRun 2006: Coast 2 Coast, the game contains the fifteen courses from OutRun 2 SP and ten officially licensed Ferraris. OutRun Online Arcade also supports online head-to-head play for six players, as well as high definition graphics.  To promote the game, Sega Europe held a contest in which the winner of a race would receive a trip to Maranello, Italy, where Ferraris are manufactured. The game was released for the Xbox 360 on April 15, 2009, and was part of Microsoft's Days Of Arcade promotion. The PlayStation 3 release followed one day later, exclusive to the European region.

The release was prior to Microsoft's raising of the maximum size of Xbox Live Arcade titles to 2 gigabytes, which would happen later that fall. Because of this, developer Sumo Digital had only 350 megabytes in which to fit the game. In order to fit the game into the size restrictions, several elements of OutRun 2006: Coast 2 Coast were removed from the game, including the fifteen original OutRun 2 stages, several cars, and the player's choice of a passenger. Reviewers speculated that the developer would release additional content, bringing some of the lost content back as downloadable content. However, to date no downloadable content has been released. The game was removed from the PlayStation Network in October 2010, with the Xbox Live Arcade version being scheduled for removal in December 2011. Sega explained that the removal of the title was due to "the expiry of the contract with Ferrari".

Reception

OutRun Online Arcade was fairly well received by critics.  Aggregate sites GameRankings and Metacritic report scores of 78.97% and 79/100 for the Xbox 360, respectively. GameRankings reports a score of 78.64% for the PlayStation 3 version. Individual scores were mostly positive, with only two scores below the 70% range across both platforms. The game was first in sales on Xbox Live Arcade for the two weeks following its release, dropping to seventh during the third week.

Reviewers' overall impressions of the game were positive.  Games Master UK called it a "timeless classic" with a "reasonable download price".  GamePro noted the game's high replay value and reasonable price. IGN favorably compared the game to the original 1986 Out Run, adding that it was a great option if "you're looking to waste a few hours drifting". Reviewers were mostly in accord in praising OutRun Online Arcades arcade-style gameplay.  They generally appreciated the HD resolutions and the other graphical improvements made to the OutRun 2 engine. Game Revolution called OutRun Online Arcade "one of the better-looking 3D games on Xbox Live Arcade and PlayStation Network", citing graphical improvements to the cars in addition to the new lens flare and light bloom features.

Some reviewers complained of faulty multiplayer components. VideoGamer.com felt the online portion was lacking considering the inclusion of the word online in the game's title.  1UP.com noted that though the game was worth the price, they would have preferred to pay a higher price to have additional content and a more stable online experience. Game Revolution also expressed disappointment in the fact that game modes and cars from OutRun 2 and OutRun 2006 were excluded from the game.

References

External links

2009 video games
Multiplayer online games
OutRun
PlayStation 3 games
PlayStation Network games
Video games developed in the United Kingdom
Xbox 360 games
Xbox 360 Live Arcade games
Multiplayer and single-player video games
Sumo Digital games
Racing video games